The Mariu were an indigenous Australian people of the Northern Territory. Their language is unattested, but may have been Miriwung.

Country
The Bullo River also formed part of their land.

Social organization
In 1900, R. H. Mathews presented a paper attributing to the Mariu, together with other "large and important tribes", from both Western Australia and the Northern Territory, such as the Gija, Perrakee, Gooniyandi, Nyigina, Bunuba, Djaru and Walmadjari an 8 section marriage system among clans, which he illustrated in the following general table.

Alternative names
 Mayu
 Mayoo
 Mariung

Notes

Citations

Sources

Aboriginal peoples of the Northern Territory